Enab (also Romanized as Eʿnāb; also known as Eman Āb-e Qadīm, Eman Āb, and Īmanāb-e Qadīm) is a village in Qurigol Rural District, in the Central District of Bostanabad County, East Azerbaijan Province, Iran. At the 2006 census, its population was 438, in 77 families.

References 

Populated places in Bostanabad County